Kim Ji-Min (born 27 November 1984) is a South Korean footballer.

Kim was drafted in the 2009 K-League Draft by Ulsan Hyundai, but never appeared for either first team, and he moved to Pohang Steelers. After one of his less successful spells at Pohang he transferred to Daejeon Citizen in 2009 where he appeared in six games. In 2010, he joined Sangju Sangmu for military duty. Following discharge from the army, he returned to Daejeon in September 2011. After the 2011 season his contract with Daejeon was terminated by mutual consent.

External links 

1984 births
Living people
South Korean footballers
Ulsan Hyundai FC players
Pohang Steelers players
Daejeon Hana Citizen FC players
Gimcheon Sangmu FC players
Suwon FC players
K League 1 players
Association football forwards